An election to the Islamic City Council of Tehran took place on 19 May 2017, along with the local elections nationwide.

The council is elected by the plurality-at-large voting system. This election saw losses for the Principlists and the Reformists gained all 21 seats.

More than 3.6 million voters turned out in the election, setting a record.

Campaign
In January 2017, reformists started working with moderates and supporters of Hassan Rouhani to compile a shared electoral list of candidates for City Council of Tehran. In April 2017, the Moderation and Development Party joined the Reformists' Supreme Council for Policymaking, the body responsible for picking the candidates included in the list. The final list under the brand name The List of Hope, drew criticism from reformists but was eventually endorsed by Mohammad Khatami. It included only 2 out of the 13 incumbent reformist councilors and several well-known reformist figures were not included. Some reform-minded non-partisans were also expected to feature in the list, including whistleblower Yashar Soltani, social activists Leila Arshad and Ameneh Shirafkan, and Taraneh Yalda, a cityplanner. As a result, two other lists emerged: Omīd-e Eṣlāḥāṭ, partially made up of the incumbent reformist councilors and Šaḥr-e Dīgar by independent activists.

The conservative camp and its newly established umbrella organization Popular Front of Islamic Revolution Forces that supported the incumbent mayor Mohammad Bagher Ghalibaf, unanimously endorsed the list published under the name Ḵedmaṭ.

Several candidates who were initially approved, including former Islamic Iran Participation Front MP Ali Tajernia, Office for Strengthening Unity activist Abdollah Momeni and Emad Behavar of the Freedom Movement of Iran among others, were declared disqualified after Revolutionary Guards Intelligence agency reportedly forced the Central Election Supervisory Board.

Results

References

Tehran
2017
2010s in Tehran